The Sydney Stock Exchange (SSX) is a stock exchange with its headquarters in Sydney, Australia. It is a wholly owned subsidiary of the AIMS Financial Group, with a market license granted by the Australian Securities  & Investment Commission (ASIC) on 5 November 2013. Formerly known as the Asia Pacific Exchange (APX), APX listed its first few companies on 6 March 2014.

History 
The exchange first opened in 1997 as the Australian property exempt market before receiving a stock exchange licence in August 2004. In November 2015, the exchange was renamed to the Sydney Stock Exchange.

See also 
 List of stock exchanges in the Commonwealth of Nations

References

External links 
 Sydney Stock Exchange web site
 Former Asia Pacific Stock Exchange web site
 Austock Group web site

2004 establishments in Australia
Stock exchanges in Australia
Organizations established in 2004
Financial services companies based in Sydney